The McDowell Memorial Presbyterian Church is a historic church in north Philadelphia, built in the Richardson Romanesque style by architects Henry Augustus Sims and J. William Shaw.

It was listed on the National Register of Historic Places in September, 2013.

References

External links
NRHP nomination form

Churches in Philadelphia
Presbyterian churches in Pennsylvania
Properties of religious function on the National Register of Historic Places in Philadelphia
Churches completed in 1893
North Central, Philadelphia
Churches on the National Register of Historic Places in Pennsylvania